Newport Bridge may refer to:
Claiborne Pell Newport Bridge, a bridge over Narragansett Bay in Rhode Island
Newport Bridge (Arkansas) over the White River in Newport, Arkansas
Bridges over the River Usk in the city of Newport, South Wales:
Newport Town Bridge, a road bridge
Newport City Bridge, a road bridge
Newport City footbridge, a pedestrian/cycle footbridge
Newport Transporter Bridge, a car and pedestrian bridge
Tees Newport Bridge in Middlesbrough, England 
 Yaquina Bay Bridge in Newport, Oregon
Saigon Bridge, formerly known as Newport Bridge, a bridge over the Saigon River, built during the Vietnam War